The siege of Buda was a military operation led by the Ottoman Empire with the aim of capturing Buda and installing John Zápolya as its ruler.

Ferdinand I was able to defeat John Zápolya in September 1527 and have himself crowned in November. Zápolya refused to give up his claims to the Hungarian throne and therefore appealed to Suleiman for recognition in return for tribute. Suleiman accepted Zápolya as his vassal in February and in May 1529 Suleiman personally embarked on his campaign.

On 26–27 August Suleiman had Buda encircled and the siege began. The walls were destroyed by intensive cannon and gun fire of the Ottoman artillery between 5 and 7 September. The military preparedness, uninterrupted attacks and physical and psychological destruction that was caused by the Ottoman artillery had the desired effect. The German mercenaries surrendered and ceded the castle to the Ottomans on 8 September. John Zápolya was installed in Buda as a vassal of Suleiman.

After the defeat of Ferdinand his supporters were promised safe passage from the town, however the Ottoman troops slaughtered them outside of the city walls.

References

Battles involving the Ottoman Empire